Pakapaka is an Argentine television channel and website providing shows and original programming for children ages 2 to 12 and their families. Launched initially as a programming section in the Encuentro television channel on September 23, 2007, and later as a digital terrestrial television and FTA channel on September 17, 2010, although regular transmissions begun on September 9. It is operated by Argentina's Ministry of Education.

The word paka paka in Quechua language refers to the "hide and seek" game.

Programming

The channel transmits 24 hours a day. Its programming is divided in two blocks. The first one Ronda Pakapaka, aimed to 2 to 5 years old (preschoolers), contains the following programmes:
 Los mundos de Uli
 Medialuna y las noches mágicas
 Molly (Die kleine Monsterin
 Soli y Lu
 Tincho

The second block, for children from 6 to 12 years old, contains the following programmes:
 + pelis
 Biblioteca infinita
 Cachorros de zoo
 Cineclub Pakapaka
 Cuentos muy, muy exagerados
 El libro de la selva
 En globo por el globo
 Feria de variedades
 Hostal Morrison
 Kikirikí
 La casa de la ciencia
 Mi Genial y Fantástico Sasquatch
 Notipakapaka
 Pakapaka de película
 Siesta Z
 S.O.S. Mediadores
 Stella y Sam
 Un dibujo muy animado
 Tinga Tinga Tales

Past programmes 
 Animapaka
 Aquí estoy yo
 Autoretrato
 Caja rodante
 Calibroscopio
 Caracoles
 Castle Farm
 Cazurros al cuadrado
 CienciaCierta
 Cuentos de cachorros
 Dale Qué
 Scary Larry
 El mundo de los ¿por qué?
 El taller de historias
 El show de Perico
 Eva
 Fun with Claude
 Hailey y sus amigos 
 Horizontes
 Hotel de zombis
 Inventia
 La asombrosa excursión de Zamba
 Misión aventura
 Moko
 Ruby Buuu!
 Teca en la tele
 Todo sobre comadrejas
 Veo Veo
 ¿Y ahora qué?
 Yoko! Jakamoko! Toto!
 Zapa Zapa
 Zoé Kézako

References

External links 
 
 

Television stations in Argentina
Commercial-free television networks
Children's television networks
Television channels and stations established in 2010
2010 establishments in Argentina